An epitaph is a short text honoring a deceased person. Strictly speaking, it refers to text that is inscribed on a tombstone or plaque, but it may also be used in a figurative sense. Some epitaphs are specified by the person themselves before their death, while others are chosen by those responsible for the burial. An epitaph may be written in prose or in poem verse.

Most epitaphs are brief records of the family, and perhaps the career, of the deceased, often with a common expression of love or respect—for example, "beloved father of ..."—but others are more ambitious. From the Renaissance to the 19th century in Western culture, epitaphs for notable people became increasingly lengthy and pompous descriptions of their family origins, career, virtues and immediate family, often in Latin. Notably, the Laudatio Turiae, the longest known Ancient Roman epitaph, exceeds almost all of these at 180 lines; it celebrates the virtues of an honored wife, probably of a consul.

Some are quotes from holy texts, or aphorisms. One approach of many epitaphs is to "speak" to the reader and warn them about their own mortality. A wry trick of others is to request the reader to get off their resting place, inasmuch as the reader would have to be standing on the ground above the coffin to read the inscription. Some record achievements (e.g., past politicians note the years of their terms of office). Nearly all (excepting those where this is impossible by definition, such as the Tomb of the Unknown Soldier) note name, year or date of birth, and date of death. Many list family members and the relationship of the deceased to them (for example, "Father / Mother / Son / Daughter of").

History 
The history of epitaphs extends as far back as the ancient Egyptians and have differed in delivery. The ancient Greeks utilised emotive expression, written in elegiac verse, later in prose. Ancient Romans' use of epitaphs was more blunt and uniform, typically detailing facts of the deceased – as did the earliest epitaphs in English churches. "May the earth lie light upon thee" was a common inscription for them. Due to the influence of Roman occupiers, the dominant language of epitaphs was Latin, evidenced by the oldest existing epitaphs in Britain. French and English came into fashion around the 13th and 14th centuries, respectively.

By the 16th century, epitaphs had become more literary in nature and those written in verse were involved in trade. In America and Britain, comedic epitaphs are common in the form of acrostics, palindromes, riddles, and puns on names and professions – Robert Burns, the most prolific pre-Romantic epitaphist, wrote 35 pieces, them being largely satirical. The rate of literary epitaphs has been historically overshadowed by "popular sepulchral inscriptions which are produced in countless numbers at all time"; "strictly literary" epitaphs were most present during the start of the Romantic period. 

The Lake Poets have been credited with providing success to epitaph-writing adjacent to that of poetry significance – Robert Southey, in focusing simultaneously upon transience and eternity, contributed substantially. General interest for epitaphs was waning at the cusp of the 19th century, in contrast to a considerable burgeoning intellectual interest. Critical essays had been published before on the matter, possibly contributing towards its flourishing in the latter half of the 18th century. Epitaphs never became a major poetic form and, according to Romantic scholar Ernest Bernhardt-Kabisch, they had "virtually disappeared" by 1810. "The art of the epitaph was largely lost in the 20th century", wrote Encyclopedia Britannica.

Format 
Sarcophagi and coffins were the choice of ancient Egyptians for epitaphs; brasses was the prominent format for a significant period of time. Epitaphs upon stone monuments became a common feature by the Elizabethan era.

Epitaphs in England

Medieval era

Stock phrases or standard elements present in epitaphs on mediaeval church monuments and ledger stones in England include:
Hic jacet.. (here lies...)
... cuius animae propitietur deus amen (generally abbreviated to cuius aie ppitiet ds ame with tildes indicating the omitted letters) ("whose soul may God look upon with favour Amen")
Memoriae sacrum ... / MS ("Sacred to the memory (of) ...")

Modern era
Requiescat in pace / RIP ("may he rest in peace")

Notable examples

Poets, playwrights and other writers

Statesmen

Mathematicians

Soldiers

Entertainers

Activists

Other

Monuments with epitaphs

In music
In a more figurative sense, the term may be used for music composed in memory of the deceased. Igor Stravinsky composed in 1958 Epitaphium for flute, clarinet and harp. In 1967 Krzysztof Meyer called his Symphony No. 2 for choir and orchestra Epitaphium Stanisław Wiechowicz in memoriam. Jeffrey Lewis composed Epitaphium – Children of the Sun for narrator, chamber choir, piano, flute, clarinet and percussion. In 1969, King Crimson released the song Epitaph, giving a reference to epitaphs within the song. Bronius Kutavičius composed in 1998 Epitaphium temporum pereunti. Valentin Silvestrov composed in 1999 Epitaph L.B. (Епітафія Л.Б.) for viola (or cello) and piano. In 2007 Graham Waterhouse composed Epitaphium for string trio as a tribute to the memory of his father William Waterhouse. The South African poet Gert Vlok Nel wrote an (originally) untitled song, which appeared on his first music album "Beaufort-Wes se Beautiful Woorde" as "Epitaph", because his producer Eckard Potgieter told him that the song sounded like an epitaph. David Bowie's final album, Blackstar, released in 2016, is generally seen as his musical epitaph, with singles "Blackstar" and "Lazarus" often singled out.

In space
In the late 1990s, a unique epitaph was flown to the Moon along with the ashes of geologist and planetary scientist Eugene Shoemaker. At the suggestion of colleague Carolyn Porco, Shoemaker's ashes were launched aboard the Lunar Prospector spacecraft on January 6, 1998. The ashes were accompanied by a laser-engraved epitaph on a small piece of foil. The spacecraft, along with the ashes and epitaph, crashed on command into the south polar region of the Moon on July 31, 1999.

See also 
 Chronogram
 Cenotaph
 Death poem
 Epigraph
 Epitaph (TV series)
 Eulogy
 Epitaphios logos (ancient Greek funeral oration)
 Hero stone
 Seikilos epitaph
 Epitaph Records

References

Bibliography 
Vidor, Gian Marco (2014). Satisfying the mind and inflaming the heart: emotions and funerary epigraphy in nineteenth-century Italy. Mortality (Routledge), on-line edition. http://www.tandfonline.com/eprint/fByCJS8IEiui62NK5wrq/full#.U_HCzFOBq3o
Bertrand, Régis (2005). Que de vertus. Les épitaphes édifiantes des débuts du XIXe siècle. In R. Bertrand, A. Carol, & J.-N. Pelen (Eds.), Les narrations de la mort (pp. 241–255). Aix-en-Provence: Publications de l'Universite' de Provence.
Guthke, K. S. (2003). Epitaph culture in the west. Variations on a theme in cultural history. Lewiston, NY: Mellen.

External links 

 
 Kohima Epitaph

Acknowledgements of death
Inscriptions by type